Friedrich ("Fritz") Hendrix (6 January 1911 in Aachen – KIA 30 August 1941 in Proletarskaja near Leningrad) was a German athlete who competed mainly in the 100 metres.

He competed for Germany in the 1932 Summer Olympics held in Los Angeles, United States in the 4 x 100 metre relay where he won the silver medal with his team mates Helmut Körnig, Erich Borchmeyer and Arthur Jonath.

He was married to Marie Dollinger who competed in three Olympic Games. Their daughter Brunhilde Hendrix won also a silver medal at the 1960 Summer Olympics.

He was killed in action during World War II.

References

1911 births
1941 deaths
German male sprinters
Olympic silver medalists for Germany
Athletes (track and field) at the 1932 Summer Olympics
Olympic athletes of Germany
German military personnel killed in World War II
Sportspeople from Aachen
Medalists at the 1932 Summer Olympics
Olympic silver medalists in athletics (track and field)